The 2020 Georgia State Panthers football team represented Georgia State University (GSU) in the 2020 NCAA Division I FBS football season. The Panthers were led by fourth-year head coach Shawn Elliott. This was the Panthers' eighth season in the Sun Belt Conference, third within the East Division, and 11th since starting college football. They played their home games at Center Parc Stadium.

Schedule
Georgia State had games scheduled against Alabama, Murray State, and Charlotte which were canceled due to the COVID-19 pandemic.

Schedule Source:

Game summaries

Louisiana

East Carolina

at Arkansas State

at Troy

Coastal Carolina

Louisiana–Monroe

at Appalachian State

at South Alabama

Georgia Southern

vs. Western Kentucky (LendingTree Bowl)

References

Georgia State
Georgia State Panthers football seasons
LendingTree Bowl champion seasons
Georgia State Panthers football